Onda or Ondas may refer to:

Places
 Onda, Arkansas, an unincorporated community in Washington County
 Onda, Castellón, a municipality of province of Castellón, Valencian Community, Spain
 Onda, Bankura, a village in Bankura district, West Bengal, India
 Onda (community development block), an administrative division in Bankura district in the Indian state of West Bengal
 Onda (Vidhan Sabha constituency), an electoral constituency in Bankura district
 Onda Station, Yokohama, Japan

Organizations
 CD Onda, a football club based in Onda, Castellón, Spain
 Onda Mobile Communication, an Italian telecommunications company
 ONDA (Morocco), a Moroccan airports operator
 Onda (sportswear), a Portuguese sportswear brand
 ONDA (Venezuela), a Venezuelan political organization

Music
 Ondas (award), Spanish music awards
 Ondas (album), a 1981 album by New Zealand jazz pianist Mike Nock
 Ondas, a 2000 album by German band Estampie
 Onda (Jambinai album), a 2019 album by South Korean band Jambinai
Onda, singer and member of South Korean girl group Everglow

Other uses
 Onda (surname), a Japanese surname
 La Onda, a Mexican artistic movement

See also